The men's marathon at the 1980 Summer Olympics in Moscow, USSR had an entry list of 76 competitors, with 74 athletes from 40 nations starting and 53 runners finishing the race held on Friday 1 August 1980. The maximum number of athletes per nation had been set at 3 since the 1930 Olympic Congress. The event was won by Waldemar Cierpinski of East Germany, the second man to successfully defend Olympic gold in the marathon (after Abebe Bikila in 1960 and 1964). Both the Netherlands (Gerard Nijboer's silver) and the Soviet Union (Satymkul Dzhumanazarov's bronze) won their first men's Olympic marathon medals.

Background

This was the 19th appearance of the event, which is one of 12 athletics events to have been held at every Summer Olympics. Returning runners from the 1976 marathon included defending champion Waldemar Cierpinski of East Germany, bronze medalist (and 1972 silver medalist) Karel Lismont of Belgium, fifth-place finisher (and two-time doubler in the 5000 metres and 10000 metres) Lasse Virén of Finland, seventh-place finisher Leonid Moseyev of the Soviet Union, and tenth-place finisher Henri Schoofs of Belgium. The two strongest challengers against a Cierpinski repeat were Bill Rodgers of the United States (1975 and 1978–80 Boston winner, 1976–79 New York winner, 1977 Fukuoka winner, and 1976 Olympian) and Toshihiko Seko of Japan (1979–1980 Fukuoka winner). Both men, however, were kept out of the games due to the American-led boycott.

Algeria, the Republic of the Congo, Lebanon, Lesotho, Libya, Madagascar, the Seychelles, and Zimbabwe each made their first appearance in Olympic men's marathons. Great Britain made its 17th appearance, most of any nation competing but one behind the boycotting United States.

Competition format and course

As all Olympic marathons, the competition was a single race. The marathon distance of 26 miles, 385 yards was run over a "very flat" out-and-back route along the Moskva river.

Records

These were the standing world and Olympic records prior to the 1980 Summer Olympics.

No new world or Olympic bests were set during the competition.

Schedule

All times are Moscow Time (UTC+3)

Results

See also
 1978 Men's European Championships Marathon (Prague)
 1980 Marathon Year Ranking
 1982 Men's European Championships Marathon (Athens)
 1983 Men's World Championships Marathon (Helsinki)
 1986 Men's European Championships Marathon (Stuttgart)

References

Marathon
Marathons at the Olympics
1980 marathons
Men's marathons
Men's events at the 1980 Summer Olympics